The Cathedral of Light or Lichtdom was a main aesthetic feature of the Nazi Party rallies in Nuremberg from 1934 to 1938. Designed by architect Albert Speer, it consisted of 152 anti-aircraft searchlights, at intervals of 12 metres, aimed skyward to create a series of vertical bars surrounding the audience. The Cathedral of Light was documented in the Nazi propaganda film Festliches Nürnberg, released in 1937.

Background
Speer had been commissioned by Adolf Hitler to build a stadium for the annual party rallies, but the stadium could not be completed in time for the 1933 rally. As a stopgap, he used 152 antiaircraft searchlights pointed upwards around the assembly area.

The searchlights were borrowed from the Luftwaffe, which caused problems with its commander Hermann Göring, because they represented most of Germany's strategic reserve. Hitler overruled him, suggesting that it was a useful piece of disinformation. "If we use them in such large numbers for a thing like this, other countries will think we're swimming in searchlights."

Continued use
Though they had originally been planned as a temporary measure until the stadium was completed, they continued to be used afterwards for the party rallies. A similar effect was created for the closing ceremony of the 1936 Olympic Games in Berlin by Eberhard von der Trappen with Speer's collaboration. Variants of the effect had the searchlights converge to a point above the spectators.

Equipment and impact
The Flak Searchlights used were developed in the late 1930s and used 150-centimeter-diameter parabolic glass reflectors with an output of 990 million candelas. The system was powered by a 24-kilowatt generator, based around a 51-horsepower (38 kW) 8-cylinder engine, giving a current of 200 amperes at 110 volts. The searchlight was attached to the generator by a cable 200 meters long. The system had a detection range of about 8 kilometers for targets at an altitude of between 4000 and 5000 meters.

Speer described the effect: "The feeling was of a vast room, with the beams serving as mighty pillars of infinitely light outer walls". The British Ambassador to Germany, Sir Nevile Henderson, described it as "both solemn and beautiful... like being in a cathedral of ice".

It is still considered amongst Speer's most important works.

See also

References

 (Translated from the German by Richard and Clara Winston.) Republished in paperback in 1997 by Simon & Schuster, .

External links
 
 Photos from 1933-1938 Nuremberg Rallies

History of Nuremberg
Architectural lighting design
Nazi culture
1930s in Germany
Searchlights
1934 establishments in Germany
1938 disestablishments in Germany
Light art
Albert Speer